("Cherished Liberty") is a French association created in March 2001 under the name  ("Liberty, I write your name"). Promoting libertarian values both in society and in the media,  as of January 2004 turned itself into a federation of associations active in the whole of French territory.

The name "" alludes to "Liberté chérie, j'écris ton nom" by French poet Paul Eluard, first published in "Poésie et vérité" (1942).

See also 
Libertarianism
Tax Freedom Day

External links 
 website

2001 establishments in France
Think tanks established in 2001
Libertarianism in France
Libertarian think tanks
Think tanks based in France
Political and economic think tanks based in France